Kerstin Helena Bouveng (born 9 August 1962) is a Swedish politician of the Moderate Party. She has been Member of the Riksdag since the 2006 general election, representing her home constituency Jönköping County.

In the Riksdag, Bouveng is currently a deputy member of The Swedish Delegation to the Nordic Council, a deputy member of The Riksdag Appeals Board, a deputy member of the Nominations Committee, a deputy member of the Committee on Cultural Affairs and a regular member of the Committee on Taxation.

Bouveng is the daughter of Nils Bouveng, founder of Sapa Group.

References

External links 
Helena Bouveng at the Riksdag website

1962 births
21st-century Swedish women politicians
Living people
Members of the Riksdag 2006–2010
Members of the Riksdag 2010–2014
Members of the Riksdag 2014–2018
Members of the Riksdag 2018–2022
Members of the Riksdag 2022–2026
Members of the Riksdag from the Moderate Party
Women members of the Riksdag